The Christa McAuliffe Space Center (known as the McAuliffe Space Center or CMSC), in Pleasant Grove, Utah, teaches school children about space and is visited by students from around the world. It has a number of space flight simulators.

The center, named for educator Christa McAuliffe, who was killed in the Challenger disaster, was started in 1990 by Victor Williamson, an educator at Central Elementary School. It is a  building added onto Central Elementary. It aims to teach astronomy and social studies through the use of simulators; the first, Voyager, proved itself popular, and a new planetarium built in 2020. As the years passed, the demand for flights expanded and new ships were commissioned. In October 2012, the space center was temporarily closed at Central Elementary, but re-opened following several district-mandated upgrades, closures, and maintenance procedures in Spring 2013. The original simulators, along with the school that housed them, was demolished on May 5, 2020 to make way for a new space center built behind the original property. The new Space Center was built housing the 2nd largest planetarium in the State of Utah that started running shows in November of 2020. The Christa McAuliffe Space Education Center switched its name and took out the word Education from the title in 2018. In 2018, they also updated their logo to a new stylized version of the original. (New version not shown)

The simulators employed by the center have included the following (in order of original construction):

The USS Voyager (Original 1990) (Decommissioned 2012/2013, New 2018) The Voyager appears as the USS Enterprise-D. It held from nine to eleven people. The new Voyager is now located at Renaissance Academy in Utah, a separate Space Center than the Christa McAuliffe Space Center.
The USS Odyssey (Original 1995, New 2013, Current 2021)  The Odyssey's appearance was created by Paul S. Cargile, an independent sci-fi artist. It takes on the appearance of the Banzai-class fighter. It holds six to eight people.
The USS Galileo  (Original Mark-5: 1998, New Mark-6: 2009, Current 2021) The Galileo is a shuttle craft. It usually goes on stealth missions. It can hold five to six people. The original simulator could be physically seen from the outside.
The USS Magellan (Original Space Station: 1998, Renovated: 2006, Starship: 2012, Current 2021) – The Magellan had the appearance of Deep Space 9. The Magellan has been transformed into a starship with the appearance of a Daedalus-class starship from Stargate. The bridge crew can be anywhere from ten to twelve people. 
The Falcon (Original 2000) (Decommissioned) – The Falcon showed students what space travel might be like in the future.
The USS Phoenix (Original 2005, Current 2021) – The Phoenix is a Defiant-class escort, like DS9's USS Defiant. It is the Space Center's only battleship. It could hold five to six people. It has been updated to an Astrea Class Destroyer, which can now hold six to seven people. 
The IMS Falcon (New 2021) – The Falcon Is the only ship in the fleet that does not belong to the United Federation of Planets. It holds six to eight crew members.
The USS Cassini (New 2021) – The Cassini is a deep space exploration vessel. It holds nine to elevens crew members.
Each simulator has its own plaque.  The plaque displays the ship's names and other things about that specific simulator. Some are inside the simulator, and some of them are hidden out of plain sight.

Most missions are based on, or at least contain aspects similar to the Star Trek universe. The Simulators themselves are replicas of Star Trek ships and various races (like the Romulans) are often involved in missions.

The center, and its founder were honored in a ceremony in its 15th year by many individuals, including Gary Herbert, the Lieutenant Governor of Utah. At that time, with its five spaceship simulators, it was educating 16,000 students a year.

The center's mission statement is A Utah Arts, Sciences, Technology Education Initiative. We Practice the Discipline of Wonder.

Teaching method 
The Space Center uses it simulators in order to create interactive stories, usually applicable to historical events, in which the students are involved. Since November of 2020, they also use the planetarium that was built during their 2020 rebuild. 

Students also learn and apply different aspects of astronomy and science in missions. They get the chance to learn about black holes, nebulae, asteroids, planets, planetary systems, moons, and a variety of other phenomena.

Students who attended the Space Center 15 years ago are now pursuing fields in science, technology, space exploration, programming, and electrical engineering. Students at the local Brigham Young University have the opportunity to develop consoles and equipment for the Space Center; gadgets such as Tricorders, touch panel equipment, fiber optics  systems, ships, and digital/analog control interfaces all help to give a more realistic effect to the experience.

The center's staff hopes that its visitors are tomorrow's scientists.

Simulator Technology
The Space Center employs technologies and equipment to achieve its simulations. In each ship, there is a powerful sound system (including a powerful bass response to simulate the feeling of the reactor core) hooked up to an industry standard mixing board which combines input from a combination of sound sources heard through the main speakers, such as, sound effects, music, DVD players, CD players, microphones, and voice distorters.

The video system is just as complex. Each mission available has a story DVD with clips compiled for scenes in a story and other visual effects.  These video sources are all controlled by a video switcher so that it appears to be a seamless video.  In addition to movie clips, the Space Center also makes its own tactical screens.  Tactical screens are in essence complex power points that can be networked to display real time information about the ship.  This information may include information about things related to the current story such as ship systems while others may be maps or other mission information.  Various programs have been used to create these screens including HyperCard, Runtime Revolution, and Thorium.

Each simulator is also equipped with a lighting system allowing both red and white lights to be displayed; red during alerts and white during normal alert levels. Each set of lights is attached to a dimmer in the control room allowing the lights to manually fluctuate in different events during a mission, such as a torpedo impact or power failure. The most advanced set of lights at the Space Center is installed in the Galileo. The lighting system in the Galileo is capable of being controlled via computer making effects seem more realistic.

In order to ensure that campers are safe, a network of closed circuit cameras is also installed at key points on the set to monitor their positions. Each simulator has part of the bridge and connected areas of the set monitored at all times.

The most complex part of each simulator is the computer systems. Each ship has several computers installed. The smallest set, the Galileo, has five, while the largest set, the Magellan, has 13. Each one of these computers (excluding sound effect computers and tactical [main viewer] computers) is connected to a network allowing communication between computers. In this way, the programs on each of the computers are also able to communicate with each other, allowing the control room to monitor the simulation and for computers on the bridge to update each other with information sent from the control room. The programming on each of the computers used to be programmed in HyperCard, which was in use on the USS Voyager until the simulator was decommissioned.  Later however, the Space Center switched to Revolution by Runtime Revolution. The next generation of programs at the Space Center were programmed in Cocoa, Apple Inc's own programming language for their Macintosh computer platform. Since 2018, the space center has used the Thorium open-source starship simulator platform, developed by a former volunteer.

Private donations paid for the simulators, while the school district pays the salary of the center's director. 181 volunteers and part-timers help to operate the simulators.

Staff
The Space Center's full-time employee is the Director. Flight Directors, Set Directors, and Bridge Supervisors are part-time employees. The volunteering organization is divided into guilds and classes of volunteers as follows:

The Flight Directors – (Dark Blue Collared Shirts) The Flight Directors (FD's) "run" the mission, --- giving cues to the actors, telling the staff when to do certain things, assigning roles, etc. The FD also is the voice of the Main Computer and the Main Engineer (whom the crew cannot see), giving them hints and tips along the way. Besides the center's director, they have the most authority, along with the Set Directors.
The Set Directors – There are six Set Directors (One for each of the simulators). The Set Directors make major decisions for the simulators that they are Set Director of. They are usually the main FD for that ship.
The Supervisors – (Bright Blue Collared Shirts) The Supervisors supervise the mission. They are the FD's right-hand men and women. They relay orders, help get the story moving, coordinate volunteers, etc. They are second in command, but are only used on missions in Magellan and Cassini, and previously in the Voyager. They work with the crews to answer any questions they may have during a mission. Many FD's start out as supervisors but not all, and many FD's still supervise even after they have been passed off as a Flight Director.
The Volunteers – (Black shirts) The Volunteers are the arms and legs of the Flight Directors. They can be assigned by the Flight Director to be the ship's doctor character, be an alien actor, be Second Chair (The Second Chair switches the lights on and off, respond to sensor scans, change what is showing on the viewscreen, send messages, etc.), or pretty much anything else the FD wants them to do.

The Guilds
(Note: All of the classes of Volunteers above except for the regular Volunteers have their own guild.

The Programming Guild – The Programming Guild (Light Blue Collared Shirts) programs the ship's controls and all they other computer programs used at the Space Center. (See above)
The Maintenance Guild – The Maintenance Guild creates the simulators, does repairs, installs new features, and pretty much holds the simulators together.
The Acting Guild  – The Acting Guild is a special set of volunteers that are trained in the "prestigious" art of acting at the Space Center.

Programs and Camps

The Space Center offers a variety of programs that provide varying mission lengths and experiences.  Continuing the educational aim of the Space Center, there are field trip programs for school classes that provide education about science, space and teamwork/leadership.  These programs also offer educational experience missions on the simulators.  For the general public, there are also private missions, and summer camps.  Private missions are available to be reserved in 2 lengths: 2.5 hour and 5 hour missions.  These time blocks include time for briefing and training in preparation for the actual mission on the simulator. In Space Center history, they used to have Overnight Camps. Overnight camps used to start on Friday nights and end on the following morning: all missions were 'paused' for the night, campers sleep at the Space Center overnight, and then missions are resumed in the morning. These missions however, are no longer available. They also had Super Saturday camps that provided the same missions as overnight camps, but occurred during the day on Saturdays. The Leadership Camp is made for an older audience of ages 15–17.  It differs from the other summer camps in the way that the whole camp is a campaign and every mission is part of a bigger picture. This camp may not be flown every summer due to the amount of planning that goes into it since it runs through multiple days. Summer camps usually happen in 1 day with a variety of activities from missions to classroom activities and planetarium shows.  The Space Center provides further information on their website, http://spacecenter.alpineschools.org/

References

External links
Official website

Space organizations
Tourist attractions in Utah
Education in Utah County, Utah
1990 establishments in Utah
Educational institutions established in 1990
Buildings and structures in Pleasant Grove, Utah
Scientific organizations established in 1990